Men's shot put events for blind & visually impaired athletes were held at the 2004 Summer Paralympics in the Athens Olympic Stadium. Events were held in two disability classes.

F11

The F11 event was won by David Casinos, representing .

24 Sept. 2004, 09:00

F13

The F13 event was won by Sun Hai Tao, representing .

21 Sept. 2004, 09:00

References

M